The aditus to mastoid antrum (otomastoid foramen or  entrance or aperture to the mastoid antrum) is a large irregular cavity that leads backward from the epitympanic recess into a considerable air space named the tympanic or mastoid antrum.

The antrum communicates behind and below with the mastoid air cells, which vary considerably in number, size, and form; the antrum and mastoid air cells are lined by mucous membrane, continuous with that lining the tympanic cavity.

On the medial wall of the entrance to the antrum is a rounded eminence, situated above and behind the prominence of the facial canal; it corresponds with the position of the ampullated ends of the superior and lateral semicircular canals.

See also
 Aditus
 Mastoid antrum
 Epitympanic recess

References

External links
 Description at umich.edu
 http://www.dartmouth.edu/~humananatomy/figures/chapter_44/44-5.HTM 

Bones of the head and neck
Ear